Goodnight Rhonda Lee is the fourth studio album by American musician Nicole Atkins. It was released in July 2017 under Single Lock Records.

Accolades

Track listing

Charts

References

2017 albums
Single Lock Records albums